Shenze is a town in and the seat of Shenze County, in southwestern Hebei province, China, about  east-northeast of the provincial capital of Shijiazhuang. , it has 26 villages under its administration.

See also
List of township-level divisions of Hebei

References

Township-level divisions of Hebei
Shenze County